The 2018 Asian Junior Athletics Championships was the 18th edition of the international athletics competition for Asian under-20 athletes, organised by the Asian Athletics Association and the Japan Association of Athletics Federations. Athletes born between 1999 and 2002 competed in 44 events, divided evenly between the sexes. The competition took place over four days from 7–10 June at Gifu Nagaragawa Stadium in Gifu, Japan.

Medal table

Medal summary

Men

Women

References

External links
 Official website

Asian Junior Athletics Championships
Asian Junior Championships
Junior Athletics Championships
Asian Junior Athletics Championships
2018 in Japanese sport
Gifu
International athletics competitions hosted by Japan
Asian Junior Athletics Championships